is a Japanese football player. He plays for FC Ryukyu.

Career
Reo Yamashita joined Gamba Osaka in 2016. On June 26, he debuted in J3 League (v Fukushima United FC).

Career statistics

Club
.

Notes

References

External links

1998 births
Living people
Association football people from Osaka Prefecture
Kindai University alumni
Japanese footballers
Association football defenders
J2 League players
J3 League players
Gamba Osaka players
Gamba Osaka U-23 players
FC Ryukyu players